FullWrite Professional was a word processor application for the Apple Macintosh, released in late 1988 by Ashton-Tate. The program was notable for its combination of a true WYSIWYG interface, powerful long-document processing features, and a well regarded outliner. It was also noted for its high resource demands, bugs, and its very late release.

In spite of these problems, FullWrite developed a faithful following and some amount of commercial success. Douglas Adams used FullWrite as his primary word processor for some time. Douglas Hofstadter published several of his books directly from FullWrite, notably Le Ton beau de Marot.

The product changed hands in the aftermath of Ashton-Tate's early 1990s business failure, and most of its problems were addressed in a major upgrade in 1995. By this point Microsoft Word dominated the Mac word processor market and the improved FullWrite never became particularly widely used. Since 1998, the product has been available as freeware.

History

Genesis
FullWrite started life at a small company, Ann Arbor Softworks, publishers of the earlier FullPaint. Among a myriad of programs that were more or less direct clones of MacPaint, FullPaint was one of the first that really differentiated itself and was successful in the market. The company opened a sales office and changed their official address to Newbury Park, California, although most of the company, notably development, remained in Ann Arbor, MI. Looking for a new product while FullPaint was maturing, the team eventually decided on a word processor.

At the time, the Mac word processor market was dominated by MacWrite, released free with the Macintosh when it first launched. MacWrite introduced a semi-WYSIWYG GUI to word processor users, and many of its conventions remain as standards today - selecting text with a drag of the mouse and then cutting it, for instance. Although MacWrite was a credible system for short documents, it lacked any of the features needed for long-document preparation, and had significant performance problems when creating documents more than a few pages long.

The DOS word processor market was dominated by programs like WordStar and WordPerfect. These programs offered considerable power, including features for footnotes, table of contents and similar, but typically wrapped in a difficult to use and non-WYSIWYG editor. In spite of these problems, these applications were the only way to edit very large documents, and their difficult learning curve was addressed largely though consulting services - the term "word processor" was also a job description at that time.

Another input into the eventual FullWrite product was the recent introduction of outliner products. These products were intended to help workers, and writers in particular, keep their work organized by introducing a top-down workflow. Instead of starting a document at the top and working their way to the bottom, outliners suggested the user first jot down their ideas in outline form, and then expand the outlines over time, in any order. If major changes had to be made, editing the outline itself could accomplish those changes in the document. There was serious consideration given to the idea that outliners might be ushering in a new way of writing. At the time, outliners were typically stand-alone products with limited integration with other applications, but there was clearly a desire for these systems to be integrated directly into the products they supported.

Design
FullWrite addressed each of these concepts and problems.

To start with, FullWrite replaced MacWrite's GUI with one that was a true WYSIWYG display, optionally allowing the entire page to be displayed exactly as it would on the printer. Unlike other programs with similar features implemented as a "preview" mode, in FullWrite the document remained fully editable in this view.

FullWrite also included a number of advanced layout features, such as user-adjustable kerning and automatic hyphenation. Text could be marked for inclusion in footnotes/endnotes, the table of contents or an index, all of which were automatically maintained. FullWrite also featured change bars, allowing users to track changes to the documents. Most of these features have since appeared on other high-end products, but at the time FullWrite was considerably more advanced than any competing products on the Mac, matching or beating the feature set of the high-end DOS products.

One of the primary "selling features" of their new word processor was its well-integrated outliner. Unlike competing designs, FullWrite's solution supported not only one document outline, but any number of them, allowing the document to be arranged in several different ways. Additionally, the outlines were not separate from the document, but parts of it, and could be displayed or hidden as the user wished. In contrast, a more traditional outliner, like the one in Microsoft Word, uses portions of the document itself as the outliner's data, often header text. This forces the outline to have a 1-to-1 relationship between the document text and its logical organization. FullWrite's system was more flexible than competing solutions, and it continues to appear in discussions about outliners to this day.

FullWrite also included the ability to attach notes to any object in the document, whether that be paragraphs, images or outliner items. Users could attach notes to the outline headers, to remind themselves what to put into that section when they came back to it later. The program also included a basic graphics editor, allowing users to add simple drawings to their documents without leaving the application. Its ability to wrap text around graphics was also notable; it did not simply move the text to the outline of the image container, it examined the image for the "drawn area" and could use that as the margin, tightly wrapping the image.

The only notable outright missing feature was that the program did not include a built-in table editor.

Development
Development started in April 1986 and pre-release advertising was launched in December announcing that it would be released in January 1987 at a price around $300. It was first shown to the public at MacWorld Expo in January 1987 with the promise that it would be released later that year. The date continued to be pushed further back. In March, Computer Reseller News reported it was being readied for April, but by August MacWEEK reported it to be "a month away" and a November issue claimed that the documentation was complete but the program was not.

By this point the product had become something of a joke in the Mac world, winning numerous (unofficial) vaporware awards. Microsoft released Word 3.0 in 1987, and Ann Arbor responded by taking out a two-page advertisement headlined DON'T BUY IT, stating that FullWrite was "a superior word processor, at a better price ... at your store within 60 days". This date was also missed.

Just prior to the January 1988 MacWorld Expo, where the company planned to ship the product, Ann Arbor was purchased by Ashton-Tate, with whom discussions had been underway for some time. The acquisition was kept a secret. At the Expo, instead of shipping, the company gave away 10,000 copies of the current beta version to drum up some buzz. This version contained an easter egg which would convert selected text into pig Latin if the user held down the right keys. The demo version of FullWrite completely filled a floppy disk, and FullWrite would crash if it did not have disk space available. Therefore, when potential customers launched the program directly off of the floppy (which was full), the program would crash. Ashton-Tate made tens of thousands of these demo disks, and was converting less than 0.1% of them to sales.

Shipping

After minor edits to change the copyright notices and packaging, the program finally shipped as version 1.1 on 27 April 1988, at a suggested retail price of $395.

Reviews of FullWrite were generally positive, and it reviewed well on feature comparisons. They also generally noted a number of bugs and generally slow performance. One reviewer found that a fast typist could outtype the editor on even a reasonably fast machine like the SE/30. Many reviews also found the interface confusing and difficult to learn, a problem that was not helped by the fact that the "Learning" manual was just a rearranged version of the reference manual.

A more serious problem was that the program needed 1 MB of RAM to work at all, and 2 MB and a hard drive to work comfortably. This was at a time when most new Macs shipped with 1 MB and used floppies for storage, and when users were starting to take advantage of the multitasking features offered by System 6's MultiFinder, using up a portion of that RAM. To make matters worse, Ashton-Tate downplayed the amount of memory required rather than admitting how much was really needed. This shortcoming limited the product's marketplace and frustrated users.

Nevertheless, the product managed to gather a loyal, if small, following. For those users with machines capable of running it, it delivered on its promise of power with a Mac interface. It was perhaps the first program on the Mac that could be used to write large documents and books, something the excellent outliner helped with enormously.

Follow-up releases
The program managed to provide most word-processing features, but it was in need of additional cleanup and attention to performance and memory footprint. Ashton-Tate, however, never addressed these issues. Three minor versions were released in 1989 and 1990: 1.5, and 1.5s. These fixed many bugs and some minor features, and 1.5s added a rarely used ability to add sound notes to documents (thus the "s" version). They also bundled an external product known as Tycho TableMaker to address that hole, but it was not well integrated, as one might expect from an external program. Microsoft Word released a major upgrade in 1988, 4.0, and Ashton-Tate never responded.

After 1990 the product was at a standstill. During this time Ashton-Tate's cash cow, dBASE, was performing poorly in the market. dBASE IV for IBM PC compatibles was released the same year as FullWrite and customers were abandoning it for the various dBASE clones like FoxPro and Clipper. By 1990 Ashton-Tate was in serious financial trouble, and was eventually purchased by Borland in 1991.

Work was underway on a cross-platform version of FullWrite, but Borland's purchase effectively ended all Mac development. In response, Ann Arbor Softworks (which still existed to serve customers of its other products) sued Borland, complaining that Ashton-Tate had failed to market the program successfully. The suit was dismissed, and analysts noted that had it gone forward, Borland and other large companies would be open to copy-cat suits from any disgruntled former developer.

Continued development
In late 1993 Borland sold off the product to Akimbo Systems, a small company started by Roy Leban, one of FullWrite's original developers. Akimbo immediately patched it to work on System 7, the latest Macintosh operating system at the time, and they released it as 1.7.

A greatly updated FullWrite 2.0 (dropping "Professional") followed early in 1995, adding a number of new features including AppleScripting, importers/exporters based on Claris's XTND, a built-in table editor, an extensive and powerful plug-in architecture (including a pig Latin plug-in), and support for the "EGO Protocol" which used AppleEvents to allow in-place editing of graphics. The most important "upgrade" was a major effort concentrating on performance and memory footprint, which was reduced by about 500 kb, allowing it to run somewhat smoothly in only 700 kb. Reviews were very positive; now the main concerns were the odd menu layout that made some commands difficult to find, and the lack of a cascading style system.

The new version was fairly well received, but by this time, Microsoft Word's stranglehold on the Mac market was complete. Akimbo re-used the layout engine to produce a new HTML-editing tool known as Globetrotter Web Publisher, designed to allow people who did not know HTML to publish complete web sites, but it gained only a scant following. After several years of small sales, Akimbo decided to release FullWrite 2.0.6 as freeware in 1998 when the company shut down. Globetrotter was not similarly released because of its use of the GIF patent, for which Unisys insisted royalties be paid, even on free copies.

Opening legacy documents

Fullwrite only ran on macOS 7–9, and no version was ever written for Mac OS X. This left users with potentially hundreds or thousands of documents that can only be opened on an archaic operating system. Currently, LibreOffice is the only modern word processor that opens Fullwrite files on a modern Mac.

See also
dBASE Mac
Full Impact
List of word processors

References
Notes

Citations

Bibliography
 

Further reading

 Tonya Engst, "FullWrite, Part I of II", TidBITS, 3 July 1995
 Tonya Engst, "FullWrite, Part II of II", TidBITS, 10 July 1995
 Tonya Engst, "FullWrite Follow-up", TidBITS, 17 July 1995

External links
 FullWrite Professional Toolbox (PDF)
 - complete "Toolbox" manual from the 1.5 release
 FullWrite Pro legacy support page
 - source for Free version (v2.0.6), helpful tips for running in modern Macintosh systems, and conversion of legacy files into other document types. * FullWrite 2.0 Review by Will Porter
 FullWrite 2.0 Review by Marc Bizer
 

Classic Mac OS word processors